George Toone is the name of:

George Toone (footballer, born 1868), father
George Toone (footballer, born 1893), son